Croxton  may refer to:

Places
Croxton, Cambridgeshire, England
Croxton, Lincolnshire, England
Croxton, Jersey City, New Jersey, USA
Croxton, Norfolk, England
Croxton, Staffordshire, England
Croxton Kerrial, a village and parish in Leicestershire, England
Croxton railway station, Melbourne, Australia

Other
Croxton Play of the Sacrament
Croxton Records, a record label founded by  Mick Thomas and Nick Corr
Croxton (automobile), a defunct USA car manufacturer